The 2018 Fitzgerald Glider Kits 300 was the seventh stock car race of the 2018 NASCAR Xfinity Series season, and the 36th iteration of the event. The race was held Saturday, April 14, 2018, in Bristol, Tennessee at Bristol Motor Speedway, a 0.533 miles (0.858 km) permanent oval-shaped racetrack. The race took the scheduled 300 laps to complete. At race's end, Ryan Preece of Joe Gibbs Racing would take the lead on the final restart with 10 laps to go and win his second and to date, final career NASCAR Xfinity Series win and his first and only win of the season. To fill out the podium, Justin Allgaier of JR Motorsports and Daniel Hemric of Richard Childress Racing would finish second and third, respectively.

Background 

The Bristol Motor Speedway, formerly known as Bristol International Raceway and Bristol Raceway, is a NASCAR short track venue located in Bristol, Tennessee. Constructed in 1960, it held its first NASCAR race on July 30, 1961. Despite its short length, Bristol is among the most popular tracks on the NASCAR schedule because of its distinct features, which include extraordinarily steep banking, an all concrete surface, two pit roads, and stadium-like seating. It has also been named one of the loudest NASCAR tracks.

Entry list 

*Driver would change to Dylan Lupton.

**The two would swap seats for the race, after Sieg destroyed his primary car in qualifying. Yeley would instead start and park the #39.

Practice

First practice 
The first practice session would occur on Friday, April 13, at 1:05 PM EST, and would last for 50 minutes.

Second and final practice 
The second and final practice session, sometimes referred to as Happy Hour, would occur on Friday, April 13, at 3:05 PM EST, and would last for 50 minutes.

Qualifying 
Qualifying was held on Saturday, April 14, at 9:35 AM EST. Since Bristol Motor Speedway is under 2 miles (3.2 km), the qualifying system was a multi-car system that included three rounds. The first round was 15 minutes, where every driver would be able to set a lap within the 15 minutes. Then, the second round would consist of the fastest 24 cars in Round 1, and drivers would have 10 minutes to set a lap. Round 3 consisted of the fastest 12 drivers from Round 2, and the drivers would have 5 minutes to set a time. Whoever was fastest in Round 3 would win the pole.

One driver would fail to qualify: Morgan Shepherd.

Full qualifying results

Race results 
Stage 1 Laps: 85

Stage 2 Laps: 85

Stage 3 Laps: 130

References 

2018 NASCAR Xfinity Series
NASCAR races at Bristol Motor Speedway
April 2018 sports events in the United States
2018 in sports in Tennessee